San Miguel Ejutla  is a town and municipality in Oaxaca in south-western Mexico. The municipality covers an area of 40.83 km². 
It is part of the Ejutla District in the south of the Valles Centrales Region.

As of 2005, the municipality had a total population of 778.

References

Municipalities of Oaxaca